Sylvia Valentin Bongo Ondimba (born 11 March 1963) is the wife of Ali Bongo Ondimba since 1989. She became the First Lady of Gabon following the inauguration of her husband as President of Gabon on 16 October 2009. She created the Sylvia Bongo Ondimba Foundation, "For the family", in January 2011 "to improve the plight of vulnerable and disadvantaged people around the world".

Family background
Born in Paris, Sylvia Valentin was barely two months old when her parents were transferred to Douala for work. She is the daughter of Edouard Valentin (died 28 January 2019), a French businessman who headed the group called Omnium Gabonais d'Assurances et de Réassurances (OGAR, Gabonese Insurance and Reinsurance). Edouard Valentin's wife, Evelyne Valentin, then became President Bongo Ondimba's secretary.

Sylvia spent most of her childhood in Cameroon along with her siblings, before the family took up residence in Tunisia.

In 1974, after a long stay by the Valentin Family in Tunisia, Sylvia and her parents decided to move to Gabon, where she received an academic and Christian education at the Libreville Immaculate Conception Institution.

In 1988, Sylvia met Ali Bongo Ondimba and married him a year later, in 1989. They have three children: Noureddin Edouard, Jalil, and Bilal, adopted by the couple in 2002. Malika would be the president's first daughter from a previous relationship.

On 16 October 2009, as Ali Bongo Ondimba was elected president, Sylvia Bongo Ondimba became Gabon's First Lady.

Her grand-children are Elizabeth, Deborah and Dyah Bongo.

Education
Sylvia Bongo Ondimba graduated with an advanced-level degree (DESS) in corporate management in France, and then decided to return to Gabon.

Career
Sylvia Bongo Ondimba was hired and promoted to the post of Deputy Managing Director of the country's largest real estate firm, Gabon Immobilier, where she was named responsible for the company's marketing and economic development.

In 1990, she created her own wealth management firm, Alliance S.A., at the age of 25.

The Sylvia Bongo Ondimba Foundation
Actions:
 The Sylvia Bongo Ondimba Foundation gave rise to the project known as the caravan through Gabon's hinterland, whose mission was to record the grievances raised by residents of the country's more isolated areas.
 The Sylvia Bongo Ondimba Foundation adopted a resolution to mark 23 June of each year as International Widows' Day, from a project initiated by Sylvia Bongo Ondimba herself.
 In April 2011, the Sylvia Bongo Ondimba Foundation donated to the Gabonese population a total of 18,000 mosquito screens.
 In October 2010, the Sylvia Bongo Ondimba Foundation donated 250 electric scooters, crutches and wheelchairs to benefit several disability assistance associations.
 The Akassi microfinance project sponsored by the Sylvia Bongo Ondimba Foundation and intended to facilitate entrepreneurship among Gabonese women and their families.

References

External links 
  Sylvia Bongo Ondimba Foundation

1963 births
Living people
People from Paris
French emigrants to Gabon
Gabonese people of French descent
First ladies and gentlemen of Gabon
21st-century Gabonese people